In mathematical representation theory, two representations of a group on topological vector spaces are called Naimark equivalent (named after Mark Naimark) if there is a closed bijective linear map between dense subspaces preserving the group action.

References

Representation theory
Equivalence (mathematics)